Kumi Mori (born 1985) is a Japanese team handball goalkeeper. She plays on the Japanese national team, and participated at the 2011 World Women's Handball Championship in Brazil.

References

1985 births
Living people
Japanese female handball players
Asian Games medalists in handball
Handball players at the 2010 Asian Games
Asian Games silver medalists for Japan
Medalists at the 2010 Asian Games
21st-century Japanese women
20th-century Japanese women